Mitsubishi Motors North America, Inc. is the U.S. operation of Mitsubishi Motors Corporation, overseeing sales and research and development functions. The company manufactures and sells Mitsubishi brand cars and sport utility vehicles through a network of approximately 350 dealers.

Its administrative headquarters is in Franklin, Tennessee, while the Mitsubishi Motors R&D of America, Inc. (MRDA) head office is in Ann Arbor, Michigan.

History
MMNA was formed in 1981 after tensions arose between Mitsubishi and its then U.S. import partner, the Chrysler Corporation, over conflicts in the international subcompact market, leading the ambitious Japanese company to establish its own sales network. The first year's allocation of 30,000 vehicles in 1982 were the $6,500 Tredia sedan, and the $7,000 Cordia and $12,000 Starion coupes, followed shortly by the Mighty Max pickup truck, and were sold through 70 dealers in 22 states.

1980s: Diamond-Star Motors

The Diamond-Star Motors joint venture with Chrysler in Normal, Illinois, began in 1985, as American-built cars would not be subject to the same restrictive quotas as vehicles imported from Japan. The company sold 67,000 cars in the United States in 1987, but by the time the new factory came onstream the next year, it offered a capacity of 240,000 vehicles. With this new capacity, Mitsubishi made a fresh push to expand its U.S. operation in 1989, increasing its sales network by 40 percent to 340 dealerships and producing its first nationwide advertising campaign.

1990s: Fastest growing U.S. brand
1991 was a landmark year for Mitsubishi in the United States. It bought Chrysler's share of Diamond-Star for $100 million, and became the first Japanese owner of a U.S. car rental agency when it purchased Value Rent-a-Car Sales of Mitsubishi-badged vehicles reached almost 190,000. The remainder of the 1990s provided both ups and downs for MMNA. The rising yen and a weak global economy caused a drop in production and profits, but it weathered the storm better than its Japanese competitors.

While its global operations were suffering in the wake of the 1997 East Asian financial crisis, MMNA reported banner results, breaking its sales records every year between 1999 and 2002 and seeing growth of 81 percent to 345,000 vehicles, while the company improved its position in Harbour and Associates' Assembly Productivity Ranking from last to first. At this point Mitsubishi was the fastest growing auto brand in the United States.

2000s: Decline and expansion
In 2002 MMNA expanded to Canada and Puerto Rico. Troubles began to emerge in 2003. One of the roots of their rapid growth was a "0–0–0" finance offer—zero percent down, zero percent interest, and nothing per month (repayments deferred for 12 months)—aimed at increasing MMNA's annual sales to 500,000 vehicles. However, numerous credit-risky buyers ended up defaulting at the end of the year's "grace period", leaving Mitsubishi with used vehicles for which they'd received no money and which were now worth less than they cost to manufacture. The company's U.S. credit operation was forced to make a $454 million provision against its 2003 accounts as a result of these losses. 

In the wake of this, as well as a Japanese recall cover-up scandal, sales plummeted from 2003 to 2005,. New introductions had mixed success, with the Outlander and Eclipse models showing sales growth in 2006, but the Endeavor SUV failing to meet expectations. A new Lancer compact car debuted in 2007, and in an effort to exploit unused capacity at its Normal, Illinois, plant more Galant sedans were produced for the export market. In 2008 Puerto Rico operations were moved to their Central and South America region division.

2010s: Turnaround begins 

2015 was a record setting year for MMNA, selling their 5th million vehicle in the United States, continuing a streak of 22 consecutive months of year-over-year sales increases and a 23 percent sales increase over the previous year. Additionally many changes were made in 2015; MMNA ended their captive finance subsidiary Mitsubishi Motors Credit of America, Inc. (MMCA). 

In July, MMNA announced that they would be closing their sole North American production facility in Normal, Illinois, known Mitsubishi Motor Manufacturing of America which built the Outlander Sport model, to focus more on the growing Asian market. Production at the plant ended in November 2015, and the plant produced replacement parts until final closure in May 2016. Electric carmaker Rivian Motors has taken over the facility. Currently, Mitsubishi is still selling cars in North America, but has since retired the Lancer Evolution.

2016 was another big year for MMNA as the Mirage, Lancer, Outlander and RVR/Outlander Sport were all refreshed in addition to releasing the Mirage sedan (G4). This contributed to increased year end sales, the largest retail sales year ever in Canada and the 4th consecutive year of sales growth in the United States. In Canada the Lancer had the largest year-over-year increase at 9.4% followed by the RVR at 7% and Outlander at 3.5%. In the United States the Outlander drove the largest sales increases year-over-year at 39.5% followed by the Mirage at 3.3%.

On June 25, 2019, Mitsubishi Motors announced it would be moving its North American headquarters from Cypress, California, to Franklin, Tennessee, a suburb of Nashville. Sister company Nissan USA also has its North American headquarters in the city.

In June 2020, speculation began that Mitsubishi may scale back its presence in North America despite sales growth or possibly withdraw altogether as part of a larger Renault-Nissan-Mitsubishi Alliance plan that will see Mitsubishi focus more on Southeast Asia and Oceania while Nissan focuses more on North America, Japan and China and Renault focuses on Europe.

On March 9, 2022, Mark Chaffin named president and chief executive officer of Mitsubishi Motors North America, replacing Yoichi Yokozawa. Yokozawa, appointed to the role in March 2020 until March 2022, it was return to Mitsubishi Motors headquarters in Tokyo and take on a new regional management role. Chaffin was officially appointed as President and CEO on April 1, 2022.

Sales

Sources: 

NOTE: Mexico sales are not included, because distribution and sales are handled by FCA Mexico.

Current vehicle lineup

Cars

SUVs

Past notable vehicles

Controversies
In 1994 MMNA was the subject of two lawsuits brought against it. The first, filed by 29 women in December 1994, accused the company of fostering a climate of sexual harassment at its Normal, Illinois plant. Then, in April 1996 the Equal Employment Opportunity Commission (EEOC) filed a class action suit on behalf of approximately 300 other women who worked at the plant. Mitsubishi initially denied any problems at its plant but later hired former U.S. Labor Secretary Lynn Morley Martin to recommend changes to its policies and practices. The 1994 suit was settled for $9.5 million in August 1997, and an agreement with the EEOC was reached later that year as well.

References

External links
 

Mitsubishi Motors subsidiaries
American subsidiaries of foreign companies
Vehicle manufacturing companies established in 1981
Companies based in Franklin, Tennessee